The 1982 Men's Hockey Asia Cup was the first edition of the Asia Cup organized by Asian Hockey Federation (AHF). It was held in Karachi, Pakistan from the 12-20 March 1982 and saw seven teams compete with an eighth (Japan) not being to compete.

Initially the competition was going to be held in Lahore, but due to the persistent rain, the event was moved to Karachi. Once there, the competition was contested in a round-robin format with each team competing against one another. After 21 matches was played, Pakistan took out the tournament winning all six matches to become the first champions of the Asia Cup ahead of India and China who finished with the silver and bronze respectively.

Qualified teams
Eight teams qualified through to the Asian Cup with the top three from the eastern qualifying group joining the remaining five teams in competing. After qualifying, Japan withdrew from the Asia Cup.

Results

Table

Matches

Winners

Final standings

References

Hockey Asia Cup
Asia Cup
International field hockey competitions hosted by Pakistan
Hockey Asia Cup
20th century in Karachi
Hockey Asia Cup
Sport in Karachi